Wake is an unincorporated community in Middlesex County, Virginia, United States. Wake has a post office with ZIP code 23176, which opened on February 19, 1898.

References

Unincorporated communities in Middlesex County, Virginia
Unincorporated communities in Virginia